Inocybe geophylla, commonly known as the earthy inocybe, common white inocybe or white fibercap, is a poisonous mushroom of the genus Inocybe. It is widespread and common in Europe and North America, appearing under both conifer and deciduous trees in summer and autumn. The fruiting body is a small all-white or cream mushroom with a fibrous silky umbonate cap and adnexed gills. An all-lilac variety lilacina is also common.

Taxonomy and naming 
It was first described in 1799 as Agaricus geophyllus by English naturalist James Sowerby in his work Coloured Figures of English Fungi or Mushrooms. Christiaan Hendrik Persoon spelt it Agaricus geophilus in his 1801 work Synopsis methodica fungorum. Its specific epithet is derived from the Ancient Greek terms geo- "earth", and phyllon "leaf".  It was given its current binomial name in 1871 by Paul Kummer.

A lilac form is known as var. lilacina; it was originally described as Agaricus geophyllus var. lilacinus by American mycologist Charles Horton Peck in 1872, who came across it in Bethlehem, New York. It was given its current name by Claude Casimir Gillet in 1876. It was classified as a separate species in 1918 by Calvin Henry Kauffman, who felt that it was consistently different and grew in different locales. A 2005 study of nuclear genes found that I. geophylla was closely related to I. fuscodisca, while I. lilacina came out as in a lineage with I. agglutinata and I. pudica.

Description 
The cap margins may split with age. It has a small bulb at the base, and often does not grow straight. The crowded gills are adnexed and cream early, before darkening to a brownish colour with the developing spores. The spore print is brown. The almond-shaped spores are smooth and measure around 9 × 5 μm. The faint smell has been likened to meal, damp earth, or even described as spermatic. The white or cream flesh has an acrid taste and does not change colour when cut or bruised.

Similar species 
Larger mushrooms can be confused with members of the genus Tricholoma or the edible Calocybe gambosa, though these have a mealy smell and gills that remain white. In Israel, it is confused with edible mushrooms of the genus Tricholoma, particularly Tricholoma terreum, and Suillus granulatus, all of which grow in similar habitat. In North America it resembles mushrooms of the genus Camarophyllus.

The variety lilacina is similar in shape but tinted lilac all over, with an ochre-brown flush on the cap umbo and the base of the stem. It has a strong mealy or earthy odour. This variety could be mistaken for the edible amethyst deceiver (Laccaria amethystina), although the latter species has a fibrous stipe, a fruity smell and lacks the ochre-coloured umbo. It is a similar coloration to the wood blewit, although mushrooms of that species generally grow much larger.

I. pudica and Clitocybe nuda are also similar.

Distribution and habitat 

Inocybe geophylla is common and widespread across Europe and North America. In western North America it is found under live oak, pine and Douglas fir. Both varieties are found in the Canadian Arctic regions of northern Manitoba and North West Territories, with the nominate form found in dryish tundra heath communities composed of American dwarf birch (Betula glandulosa), Arctic willow (Salix arctica), dwarf willow (S. herbacea), polar willow (S. polaris ssp. pseudopolaris), snow willow (Salix reticulata), bog bilberry (Vaccinium uliginosum var. alpinum), lingonberry (V. vitis-idaea var. minus), alpine bearberry (Arctostaphylos alpina), alpine bistort (Persicaria vivipara), Arctic bell-heather (Cassiope tetragona) and northern white mountain avens (Dryas integrifolia) and var. lilacina in moist mossy tundra heaths, alongside such plants as American dwarf birch, snow willow, Arctic bell-heather and northern white mountain avens. It is mycorrhizal, the fruiting bodies are found in deciduous and coniferous woodlands in summer and autumn. Within these locations, fruiting bodies may be found in grassy areas and near pathways, or often on rich, bare soil that has been disturbed at roadsides, and near ditches.

In Israel, I. geophylla grows under Palestine oak (Quercus calliprinos) and pines, with mushrooms still appearing in periods of little or no rain as they are mycorrhizal.

In Western Australia, Brandon Matheny and Neale Bougher (2005) pointed to collections of what was referred to as I. geophylla var. lilacina by some Australian taxonomists, as a misapplication of the name I. geophylla var. lilacina; the specimens have been reclassified as the species Inocybe violaceocaulis.

Toxicity 
Like many fibrecaps, Inocybe geophylla contains muscarine. The symptoms are those of muscarine poisoning, namely, greatly increased salivation, perspiration (sweating), and lacrimation (tear flow) within 15–30 minutes of ingestion. With large doses, these symptoms may be followed by abdominal pain, severe nausea, diarrhea, blurred vision, and labored breathing. Intoxication generally subsides within two hours. Delirium does not occur. 
The specific antidote is atropine. Inducing vomiting to remove mushroom contents is also prudent due to the speed of onset of symptoms. Death has not been recorded as a result of consuming this species. It is often ignored by mushroom hunters because of its small size.

References 

geophylla
Fungi of Europe
Fungi of North America
Poisonous fungi
Fungi described in 1799
Taxa named by James Sowerby